Isaac Branch is a  long 2nd order tributary to the St. Jones River in Kent County, Delaware.

Variant names
According to the Geographic Names Information System, it has also been known historically as:  
Isaac's Branch
Isaacs Branch
Isaac Branch
Mill Branch

Course
Isaac Branch rises about 1 mile southeast of Pearsons Corner in Kent County, Delaware on the Cahoon Branch divide.  Isaac Branch then flows east to meet the St. Jones River in Dover, Delaware.

Watershed
Isaac Branch drains  of area, receives about 44.8 in/year of precipitation, has a topographic wetness index of 642.83 and is about 6% forested.

See also
List of Delaware rivers

Maps

References

External links
 Isaac Branch Trail Review
 Breaknock County Park

Rivers of Delaware
Rivers of Kent County, Delaware